The rowing competition at the 1924 Summer Olympics in Paris featured seven events, all for men only. The competitions were held from Sunday to Thursday, 13 to 17 July.

Medal summary

Participating nations
A total of 181 rowers from 14 nations competed at the Paris Games:

Medal table

References

Sources

 
1924 Summer Olympics events
1924